Grand Junction may refer to:

Places

United States
 Grand Junction, Colorado
 Grand Junction Metropolitan Statistical Area, an alternate designation for Mesa County, Colorado
 Grand Junction, Iowa
 Grand Junction, Michigan
 Grand Junction, Tennessee

United Kingdom
 Grand Junction Isle, a small island in the River Thames

Transportation

Rail
 Grand Junction, Birmingham, a railway junction in Birmingham, England
 Grand Junction Railroad and Depot Company, in the Boston, Massachusetts area
 Grand Junction Railroad Bridge, across the Charles River
 Grand Junction Railway, in England
 Grand Junction Railway (Ontario), in Canada
 Grand Junction station, a train station in Grand Junction, Colorado

Other
 Grand Junction Canal, in England
 Grand Junction Regional Airport, in Mesa County, Colorado
 Grand Junction Road, through Adelaide, South Australia

Other
 Grand Junction, an Australian country music band
 Grand Junction Daily Sentinel, a daily newspaper in western Colorado
 Grand Junction High School a public high school in Grand Junction, Colorado
 Grand Junction Junior College, a campus of Colorado Mesa University in Grand Junction, Colorado
 Grand Junction milkvetch, the common name for Astragalus linifolius, a species of flowering plant in the legume family
 Grand Junction Rockies, a Pioneer League baseball team
 Grand Junction Waterworks Company, a utility company supplying water to parts of London, England

See also
 Grand union (disambiguation)